Charles Cheers Wakefield, 1st Viscount Wakefield, GCVO, CBE (12 December 1859 – 15 January 1941), was an English businessman who founded the Castrol lubricants company, was lord mayor of London and was a significant philanthropist.

Early life and family
Wakefield was born in Cheshire, the son of John Wakefield, and his wife Margaret, née Cheers, and was educated at the Liverpool Institute.

He married Sarah Frances Graham.

Business career

Wakefield patented the Wakefield lubricator for steam engines in the 1890s. In 1899 he founded the Wakefield Oil Company, but subsequently changed its name to Castrol. The name Castrol was chosen because of the castor oil that was added to the company's lubricating oils. This title has since become a household name in the United Kingdom. The Castrol brand lubricants produced by Wakefield's company were used in the engines of motor cars, aeroplanes, and motorcycles.

A Castrol endorsement contract and the generous patronage of Wakefield provided the funds for Jean Batten to purchase the Percival Gull Six G-ADPR monoplane in which she set two world records for solo flight.

City of London

Wakefield was an Alderman, a member of the Court of Common Council, Sheriff (1907), and for 1915–1916 Lord Mayor. He received a Knighthood in 1908, for services to the City of London. He was involved with a huge number of City institutions and charities, and was a co-founder of the Wakefield Trust, along with his friend the Rev'd "Tubby" Clayton, better known as the founder of the Toc H charity. On 16 February 1917 he was created a Baronet of Saltwood in the  County of Kent. He was raised to the peerage as "Baron Wakefield", of Hythe in the County of Kent on 21 January 1930, and on 28 June 1934 he was further honoured when he was created "Viscount Wakefield", of Hythe in the County of Kent.

Hythe (Kent)
In his day, Wakefield was one of the most prominent and well-known characters in the town of Hythe, Kent, and the official Year Book of Hythe Town Council, in its list of Freemen of the Borough describes him as "Hythe's greatest benefactor". He was created a Freeman of the Borough on 30 May 1930, under the provisions of the Honorary Freedom of Boroughs Act 1885. His name appears on many memorial inscriptions in Hythe today, and also lives on as the name of one of the town's masonic lodges. Viscount Wakefield is buried at Spring Lane Cemetery, Seabrook, within the Borough of Hythe, from which he took his title.

Additional notes
It is often erroneously reported that Wakefield was commonly known by the nickname, or colloquial name, of "Cheers". Although he did prefer this name, it was in fact a given (baptismal) name, his middle name, having been the maiden name of his mother. Wakefield and his wife had a daughter, Freda Ware (née Wakefield). Freda accompanied her parents on many of their public engagements including Wakefield's business trip to America as part of the Sulgrave Institution. Wakefield left Freda, her husband Ivor and her four children a living each for their futures.

Sussex Motor Yacht Club 
Wakefield was a member of Sussex Motor Yacht Club and in 1931 donated The Warwick Vase, "The International Championship of London, Challenge Trophy" to the club.

Czech Society of Great Britain
Wakefield was chairman of the Czech Society of Great Britain. He was awarded Order of the White Lion in 1923.

Howard 'Grace' Cup
In 1931 Lord Wakefield purchased a grace cup from the Howard family and donated it to the Victoria and Albert museum. The ivory bowl within the setting of the cup is said to have belonged to Thomas Becket, Archbishop of Canterbury who was murdered in Canterbury cathedral in 1170.

References

External links
British Delegation Pays Tribute to Former President and Puts Wreaths on Grave on The New York Times, 13 Sep 1922

1859 births
1941 deaths
English philanthropists
Wakefield, Charles Cheers, of Hythe
Knights Grand Cross of the Royal Victorian Order
Businesspeople from Liverpool
People educated at Liverpool Institute High School for Boys
Sheriffs of the City of London
20th-century lord mayors of London
20th-century English politicians
Burmah-Castrol
British businesspeople in the oil industry
Fellows of the Royal Geographical Society
Freemasons of the United Grand Lodge of England
Honorary Fellows of the British Academy
Grand Officers of the Order of the White Lion
Barons created by George V
Viscounts created by George V